The Deir el Qamar Synagogue, in Deir el Qamar, a village in south-central Lebanon, is the oldest synagogue in Mount Lebanon. The synagogue was built in the 17th century, during the Ottoman era in Lebanon,  to serve the local Jewish population, some of whom were part of the immediate entourage of Fakhr al-Din II. The building is in good condition. 

As of 2016, the Synagogue is in excellent condition; yet, in the meantime, the synagogue has been shut to the public for security reasons and has been entrusted to the French cultural center by Lebanon's Direction Générale des Antiquités (General Directorate of Antiquities).

See also
History of the Jews in Lebanon
Maghen Abraham Synagogue
Wadi Abu Jamil

References

External links
The Lebanese Jewish Community Council
Corporation of Lebanese Jews in Canada

Chouf District
Synagogues in Lebanon
Former synagogues
Orthodox synagogues
17th-century synagogues
Orthodox Judaism in the Arab world
Orthodox Judaism in the Middle East